The Isle of Man Open is a darts tournament that has been held since 1986.

List of tournaments

Men's

Ladies

Youth

Tournament records
 Most wins 3:  Ronnie Baxter. 
 Most Finals 4:  Ronnie Baxter,  Alan Warriner.
 Most Semi Finals 6:   Martin Adams.
 Most Quarter Finals 12:  Martin Adams. 
 Most Appearances 14:  Martin Adams.
 Most Prize Money won £6,605:  Darryl Fitton.
 Best winning average (114.65) :  Robbie Green v's  James Wilson, 2014,   Final.
 Youngest Winner age 21:   Jeffrey de Graaf. 
 Oldest Winner age 54:  Tony O'Shea.

Isle of Man Classic
From 2014 a new tournament was created which would coincide with the Isle of Man Open, this was called the Isle of Man Classic. The weekend in which both tournaments occurred was then known as "The Isle of Man Darts Festival".

References

External links

British Darts Organisation tournaments
Darts tournaments
Sport in the Isle of Man
1986 establishments in the Isle of Man
Recurring sporting events established in 1986